The 2023 Polish Speedway season is the 2023 season of motorcycle speedway in Poland. The season will run from on 8 April to 24 September.

Individual

Polish Individual Speedway Championship
The 2023 Individual Speedway Polish Championship was the 2023 version of Polish Individual Speedway Championship organised by the Polish Motor Union (PZM). The Championship will be held over three legs on 8 June, 16 July and 30 July.

Golden Helmet
The 2023 Golden Golden Helmet organised by the Polish Motor Union (PZM) is the 2023 event for the league's leading riders. The final will be held at Opole in April.

Polish U21 Championship
 winner -

Silver Helmet
 winner -

Bronze Helmet
 winner -

Pairs

Polish Pairs Speedway Championship
The 2023 Polish Pairs Speedway Championship will be the 2023 edition of the Polish Pairs Speedway Championship. The final was held on 31 March at Rzeszów .

Team

Team Speedway Polish Championship
The 2023 Team Speedway Polish Championship is the 2023 edition of the Team Polish Championship to determine the gold medal winner (champion of Poland). Teams finishing second and third are awarded silver and bronze medals respectively.

Ekstraliga
Clubs

Quarter-finals

Semi-finals

Third place

Final

1. Liga
Clubs

Quarter-finals

Semi-finals

Final

2. Liga
Clubs

Semi-finals

Final

References

Speedway leagues
Professional sports leagues in Poland
Polish
2023 in Polish speedway